Melnik may refer to

Places
 Melnik, Bulgaria, a town 
Villa Melnik Winery near Melnik, Bulgaria
Melnik Earth Pyramids near Melnik, Bulgaria
 Mělník, a town in the Czech Republic
Mělník District in the Czech Republic
 Melnik, Wisconsin, an unincorporated community in the United States
Melnik Ridge in Antarctica
Melnik Peak in Antarctica

People

See Andriy Melnyk

Other
Melnik (grape)
Melnick 34, a  massive luminous Wolf–Rayet star
Melnick 42, a massive blue supergiant star
 Melnick–Needles syndrome that affects bone development